Yavgildy (Yawgilde) is a rural locality (a village) in Burlinsky Selsoviet, Gafuriysky District, Bashkortostan, Russia. The population was 226 as of 2010. There are 5 streets.

Geography 
Yavgildy is located 35 km north of Krasnousolsky (the district's administrative centre) by road. Zirikovo is the nearest rural locality.

References 

Rural localities in Gafuriysky District